Laubach is a surname. Notable people with the surname include: 

 Claire Laubach (born 1983), American field hockey player
 Frank Laubach (1884–1970), Christian missionary and literacy advocate
 Mark Laubach, American engineer
 Thomas Laubach (after marriage Thomas Weißer, born 1964), German Catholic theologian and hymnwriter
 Tony Laubach (born 1980), American professional storm chaser and meteorologist